The Iraqi people (Syriac: ܥܡܐ ܥܝܪܩܝܐ; Turkish: Iraklılar) are people identified with the country of Iraq.

Iraqi Arabs are the largest Semitic people in Iraq, whIle Iraqi Kurds are the largest Indo-European, non-Semitic ethnic group and largest ethnic minority. Iraqi Turkmen are the third largest ethnic group in the country. Studies indicate that the different ethno-religious groups of Iraq and Mesopotamia share significant similarities in genetics and that Mesopotamian Arabs, who make up the majority of Iraqis, are genetically distinct from other Arab populations in the Arabs of the Arabian peninsula.

The population was estimated to be 45,650,145 in 2023 (residing in Iraq)  Turkmen (4.5-6 million), Assyrians (0.5 million), Yazidis (500,000), Armenians, Marsh Arabs, and Shabaks (250,000). Other minorities include Mandaeans (3,000), Roma (50,000) and Circassians (2,000). The most spoken languages are Mesopotamian Arabic, Kurdish, Assyrian Syriac and Iraqi Turkmen dialects. The percentages of different ethno-religious groups residing in Iraq vary from source to source due to the last Iraqi census having taken place over 30 years ago. A new census of Iraq was planned to take place in 2020, but this was postponed due to the COVID-19 pandemic. It was rescheduled to November 2022 but was postponed again with an "electronic national population census" planned in the last quarter of 2023.

Population

39,650,145 (2021 estimate),  ( estimate), up from 31,234,000 (April 2009 IMF estimate)

Vital statistics

UN estimates

Fertility ages average in 1997–2006

Life expectancy at birth
Average life expectancy at age 0 of the total population.

Structure of the population

Structure of the population (1 July 2013) (Estimates):

Population Estimates by Sex and Age Group (01.VII.2020):

Ethnicity

Iraq's dominant ethnic group are Arabs, who account for more than three-quarters of the population.

According to the CIA World Factbook, citing a 1987 Iraqi government estimate, the population of Iraq is formed of 65% Arabs followed by 30% Kurds. and also Marsh Arabs.

in addition, the estimate claims that other minorities form 5% of the country's population, including the Turkmen, Kaka'i, Bedouins, Roma, Assyrians/Chaldeans/Syriacs, Circassians, Mandaeans, and Persians. However, the International Crisis Group points out that figures from the 1987 census, as well as the 1967, 1977, and 1997 censuses, "are all considered highly problematic, due to suspicions of regime manipulation" because Iraqi citizens were only allowed to indicate belonging to either the Arab or Kurdish ethnic groups; consequently, this skewed the number of other ethnic minorities, such as Iraq's third largest ethnic group – the Turkmen.

Languages

Arabic and Kurdish are the two official languages of Iraq. Arabic is taught across all schools in Iraq, however in the north the Kurdish language is the most spoken. Eastern Aramaic languages, such as Syriac and Mandaic are spoken, as well as the Iraqi Turkmen language, and various other indigenous languages.

Kurdish, including several dialects, is the second largest language and has regional language status in the north of the country. Aramaic, in antiquity spoken throughout the whole country, is now only spoken by the Assyrian Chaldean minority. The Iraqi Turkmen dialect is spoken in parts of northern iraq, numerous languages of the Caucasus are also spoken by minorities, notably the Chechen community.

Religions

According to the CIA World Factbook, 98-99% of Iraqis follow Islam: 61-64% Shia and 29-34% Sunni. Christianity accounts for 1–2%, and the rest practice Yazidis, Mandaeism, and other religions.

While there has been voluntary relocation of many Christian families to northern Iraq, recent reporting indicates that the overall Christian population may have dropped by as much as 50 percent since the fall of Saddam Hussein in 2003, with many fleeing to Syria, Jordan, and Lebanon (2010 estimate). The percentage of Christians has fallen from 6% in 1991 or 1.5 million to about one third of this. Estimates say there are 500,000 Christians in Iraq.

Nearly all Iraqi Kurds identify as Sunni Muslims. A survey in Iraq concluded that "98% of Kurds in Iraq identified themselves as Sunnis and only 2% identified as Shias". The religious differences between Sunni Arabs and Sunni Kurds are small. While 98 percent of Shia Arabs believe that visiting the shrines of saints is acceptable, 71 percent of Sunni Arabs did and 59 percent of Sunni Kurds support this practice. About 94 percent of the population in Iraqi Kurdistan is Muslim.

Demographic statistics 
The following demographic statistics are from the CIA World Factbook, unless otherwise indicated.

Age structure
 0–14 years: 39.01% (male 8,005,327/female 7,674,802)
15-24 years: 19.42% (male 3,976,085/female 3,829,086)
25-54 years: 33.97% (male 6,900,984/female 6,752,797)
55-64 years: 4.05% (male 788,602/female 839,291)
65 years and over: 3.55% (male 632,753/female 794,489) (2018 est.)

Ethnic groups
Arab: 70%
Kurd: 15-25%
Turkoman: 7-9%
Assyrian/Chaldean and Other: 2%

Languages
Arabic (official)
 Kurdish (official)
 Iraqi Turkmen dialect (official only in majority speaking area)
 Assyrian dialect (Neo-Aramaic) (official only in majority speaking area)

Median age
 total: 20.2 years
 male: 20 years
 female: 20.5 years (2019 est.)

Population growth rate
 2.5% (2018 est.)

Crude birth rate
 30 births/1,000 population (2018 est.)

Crude death rate
 3.8 deaths/1,000 population (2018 est.)

Total fertility rate
 3.94 children born/woman (2018 est.)

Net migration rate
 −1.1 migrant(s)/1,000 population (2018 est.)

Urbanization
 urban population: 70.5% of total population (2018)
 rate of urbanization: 3.06% annual rate of change (2015–20 est.)

Sex ratio
 at birth: 1.04 male(s)/female
 0–14 years: 1.04 male(s)/female
15-24 years: 1.04 male(s)/female
25-54 years: 1.02 male(s)/female
 55–64 years: 0.91 male(s)/female
65 years and over: 0.8 male(s)/female
total population: 1.02 male(s)/female (2017 est.)

Maternal mortality rate
 50 deaths/100,000 live births (2015 est.)

Infant mortality rate
total population: 37.5 deaths/1,000 live births
male: 40.6 deaths/1,000 live births 
female: 34.2 deaths/1,000 live births (2018 est.)

Life expectancy at birth
 total population: 74.9 years
 male: 72.6 years
 female: 77.2 years (2018 est.)

Contraceptive prevalence rate
 51.5% (2011)

Health expenditures
 5.5% of GDP (2011)

Physicians density
 0.85 physicians/1,000 population (2014)

Hospital bed density
 1.4 beds/1,000 population (2014)

Obesity – adult prevalence rate
 30.4% (2016)

Children under the age of 5 years underweight
 8.5% (2011)

Nationality
 noun: Iraqi(s)
 adjective: Iraqi

Literacy
 definition: age 15 and over can read and write
 total population: 79.7%
 male: 85.7%
 female: 73.7% (2015 est.)

See also
Armenians in Iraq
Homelessness in Iraq
Iraqi diaspora
Youth in Iraq

References

Further reading
Zubaida, Sami. "Jews & Others in Iraq." ISIM review 22 (2008): 6–7.

External links
 populationpyramid

The World Factbook – Iraq
Linguist List partial inventory of languages and dialects of Iraq 

 
Society of Iraq